Ri Kum-suk (or  ; born 16 August 1978) is a North Korean footballer who plays for the 4.25 Sports Club. She plays a key role not only for her club, but also for national teams in the AFC Women's Asian Cup, Asian Games and FIFA Women's World Cup. She is the highest goalscorer for North Korea with 40 goals and the most prolific female footballer ever from North Korea with 165 goals.

Club career
Ri Kum-suk began her international career at the 1999 FIFA Women's World Cup at age 20. She played as a midfielder during three matches, supporting their young and talented striker Jin Pyol-hui.

In 4 years, the PRK Women's National Team qualified for the 2003 FIFA Women's World Cup and Ri teamed again with her friend Jin. In a winning match 3-0 over Nigeria she took 5 shots and 2 shots on goal. Even though, her team could not proceed to the quarterfinals, she played very well in last two games against Sweden and United States, with 6 Shots and 1 SOG.

The 2007 FIFA Women's World Cup was her best tournament. The team qualified for the finals by taking 3rd place in 2006 AFC Women's Championship due to referee judgement during the game against China. Her team belonged to Group B with United States, Sweden and Nigeria.

At their first game, against USA, and with the injury of key midfielder Ho Sun-hui at 10 minutes in the first half, they conceded a goal 50 minutes, but scored at 58 and 62 minutes. At 69 minutes the USA scored again. Ri scored in the next game against Nigeria with a head shot and the team played well enough against Sweden to get out of the group stage.

The most game she showed her strike and dribble skill was against China PR in the 15th Doha Asian Games, when the two teams tied after 90 minutes. Ri Kum-suk scored a goal in the 2nd extra time, by striking a powerful shot with her left foot.

Ri pulled a hat-trick sending DPRK into the final of the AFC Women's Asian Cup after they defeated Australia 3–0 at Thong Nat Stadium in the 2007 AFC Women's Asian Cup.

Ri also played for DPRK at the 2008 Summer Olympics.

She is the captain of the national team. Recently she retired to start a coaching career. She married Pak Chung Hyok(student of Kim Hyong Jik University Education), coach of the women's football team of the Jebi Sports Team, in November 2008, and gave birth to a son.

International goals

References

1978 births
Living people
Women's association football forwards
North Korean women's footballers
Sportspeople from Pyongyang
1999 FIFA Women's World Cup players
2003 FIFA Women's World Cup players
2007 FIFA Women's World Cup players
Footballers at the 2008 Summer Olympics
Olympic footballers of North Korea
FIFA Century Club
Asian Games medalists in football
Footballers at the 1998 Asian Games
Footballers at the 2002 Asian Games
Footballers at the 2006 Asian Games
Asian Games gold medalists for North Korea
Asian Games silver medalists for North Korea
People's Athletes
North Korea women's international footballers
Medalists at the 1998 Asian Games
Medalists at the 2002 Asian Games
Medalists at the 2006 Asian Games